Jakub Pešek (born 24 June 1993) is a Czech footballer who plays as a winger for Sparta Prague and the Czech Republic national team.

Club career
Pešek made his professional debut for Sparta Prague in the Czech First League on 9 November 2014, coming on as a substitute in the 90th minute for Ladislav Krejčí in the away match against Slovácko, which finished as a 2–0 away win. In January 2015, he went on loan to České Budějovice, who later exercised the right to sign him permanently in mid-2017. He then moved to Slovan Liberec at the start of the 2018–19 season. Pešek join his first club Sparta Prague after end of 2020-2021 season.

International career
In September 2020, Pešek received his first call-up to the Czech Republic national team for their UEFA Nations League match against Scotland on 7 September. Due to positive SARS-CoV-2 tests in the previous Czech Republic squad, all players and the coaching staff which faced Slovakia on 4 September had to be replaced. He made his international debut in the match and opened the scoring for the Czechs in the 12th minute, though the match finished as a 1–2 loss.

Career statistics

Club

International

International goals

References

External links
 
 

1993 births
Living people
People from Chrudim
Czech footballers
Czech Republic international footballers
Association football wingers
AC Sparta Prague players
SK Dynamo České Budějovice players
FC Slovan Liberec players
Czech First League players
Czech National Football League players
UEFA Euro 2020 players
Sportspeople from the Pardubice Region